Mathias Meinrad Chikawe (born 30 May 1951) is a Tanzanian CCM politician and Member of Parliament for Nachingwea constituency since 2005. He is the current ambassador of the United Republic of Tanzania to Japan.

References

1951 births
Living people
Chama Cha Mapinduzi MPs
Tanzanian MPs 2005–2010
Tanzanian MPs 2010–2015
Government ministers of Tanzania
Ambassadors of Tanzania to Japan
Mkwawa Secondary School alumni
University of Dar es Salaam alumni
Alumni of Staffordshire University